Lianjiang (BUC: Lièng-gŏng) is a county on the eastern coast in Fuzhou prefecture-level city, the provincial capital of Fujian Province, China. Most of the county is administered by the People's Republic of China (PRC), while a number of outlying islands, collectively referred to as the Matsu Islands, are administered as Lienchiang County (same Chinese character name in traditional Chinese characters and referred to using Wade–Giles romanization) by the Republic of China (ROC) (now based in Taiwan) ever since their return to ROC control after Japanese occupation in World War II.

History
Lianjiang, in 282, during the Jin dynasty, was Wenma, named after a shipyard there, Wensha Ship-hamlet (溫麻船屯). It was incorporated into Min Prefecture (閩縣) in 607, during the Sui dynasty.

Wenma was changed to the present name and made its own county in 623, during the Tang dynasty, when Baisha (白沙) or Fusha (伏沙) of Aojiang was the capital of Lianjiang County. The capital was changed to Fengcheng as today in 742.

After the Republic of China was established, Lianjiang switched back and forth numerous times between two special regions:

 Minhou Special Region (閩侯專區): 18 years in total
 Fu'an (Ningde) Special Region (福安（寧德）專區): 16 years in total

During the Second Sino-Japanese War on September 10, 1937, Japan seized the two Lianjiang islands of Beigan and Nangan via the Collaborationist Chinese Army, making the islands the first in Fujian to fall to Japan. This led the county government to relocate to Danyang Township on April 19, 1941, before returning at the end of the war.

In 1949, the county was split in two due to the Chinese Civil War, as it remains today.

On March 4, 1964, a Chinese Nationalist commando raid on the Chinese Communist Party headquarters of the county captured and returned a commune file to Taipei.

Beginning on 1 July 1983, the PRC side reverted control to Fuzhou Municipality. In the late 1980s, people living in Lianjiang County began a massive emigration wave to western countries like the United Kingdom and the United States.

Geography

 Geographic coordinates: 26°03'-26°27' N, 119°17'-120°31' E
Coastline length:

Climate

Administrative divisions

The PRC (China) administers 16 towns and 6 townships:

Towns (镇, zhen):
 Fengcheng ("Phoenix City Town")
 Mabi (Ma-pi) ("Horse Snout Town")
 Danyang
 Dongdai (Tungtai)
 Donghu ("East Lake Town")
 Guanban (Traditional: 官阪镇)
 Tailu (T’ai-lu)
 Aojiang ("Ao River Township")
 Pukou (P’u-k’ou) ("River Mouth Township")
 Toubao (T’ou-pao)
 Huangqi (Huang-ch’i, Huangchi)
 Xiao'ao (Hsiao-ao)
 Guantou (Kwantow, Kuan-t’ou;  – Guǎntóu)
 Xiaocheng (Hsiao-ch’eng;  – Xiǎochéng)
 Changlong (formerly ) ("Long Dragon")

Townships (乡, xiang):
 Xiagong (Hsia-kung)
 Xiaocang She Ethnic Township (Traditional: 小滄畲族鄉)
 Ankai
 Liaoyan
 Pandu
 Jiangnan
 Mazu*

*The People's Republic of China ("Mainland China") claims the Matsu Islands (Mazu in Hanyu Pinyin) as Mazu township of Lianjiang county but has never controlled them; they are de facto administered under Lienchiang County of the Republic of China (Taiwan).

These townships are divided into 266 villages.

Culture
Residents of Lianjiang – both on the Mainland and Matsu – speak the Lianjiang dialect, a subdialect of the Fuzhou dialect, a branch of Eastern Min. The dialect is also known as Bàng-uâ (平話).

Language 
The Lianjiang dialect is a subdialect of Fuzhou dialect (the most prestigious dialect of Min Dong or Eastern Min). The Lianjiang dialect is mutually intelligible with Fuzhou dialect. It differs from Fuzhou dialect in its tonal sandhi pattern and vowel sandhi system. Small lexical differences also exist on object names, e.g. waxmelon is called "卷瓜"  in Fuzhou but "冬瓜"  in Lianjiang.

Generally speaking, the tonal sandhi system of Lianjiang is more conservative than that of Fuzhou, in that the Lianjiang tonal sandhi is still largely controlled by the Middle Chinese tonal registers, while the Fuzhou tonal sandhi shows more deviation and irregularity.

Lianjiang vowel sandhi is more complicated than that of Fuzhou. Both Lianjiang and Fuzhou have systematic vowel variations between citation forms and non-final forms of the same morpheme, e.g. "地" /tei/ "land" – "地主" /ti-tsuo/ "landlord". However, not all morphemes have such variations. Only the morphemes with low-starting tones show such variation. The morphemes with high-starting tones instead only have the more close variant, e.g. "迟" /ti/ "late"- "迟早" /ti tsia/ "early or late". However, some cognates are produced with different vowels in Lianjiang and Fuzhou, e.g. "江 river" is produced as /kyeŋ/ in Lianjiang, but /kouŋ/ in Fuzhou. Also, the rimes in Lianjiang are generally more close and front than that in Fuzhou, which is especially salient in the open vowels, e.g. "下 down" is [ɑ] in Fuzhou, but [a] in Lianjiang.

Surrounded by mountains, Lianjiang used to be a relatively isolated from the inland part of China for centuries. This explains why the Lianjiang phonological system is relatively more conservative. However, with the construction of the high-speed railway system and the improvement of tunnel system, northern migrants are flooding into Lianjiang in the past decade, which may bring language contact into perspective. Just like in Fuzhou, most young or middle-aged Lianjiang speakers speak Mandarin Chinese fluently, but usually with a local accent influenced by the local dialect. However, due to the misleading language policy (Not speaking Mandarin Chinese is taken as "immoral".) and disadvantageous status of the dialect, both Fuzhou and Lianjiang dialects are losing speakers in the youngest generation. More and more young people and children are only receptive bilinguals in Lianjiang.

Economy

Food products:
 Farm: loquats, rice, sweet potato, bean, cotton, sugar cane, tea plant, jasmine, watermelon, mushroom, grapes, dragon fruit, rhubarb.
 Sea: hairtail, shad, pomfret, cuttlefish, garoupa, prawn, crab, clam, mudskippers.
 Other: Yuanhong wine ("元紅")

Transportation

Guantou and Kemen (可門) are the largest seaports in Lianjiang with national access.

Tourism
There are hot springs in Gui'an (貴安) and Tanghui (湯尾) of Pandu. There is a Dragon King Palace-Temple (龍宮廟) in the Xiaocang She Ethnic Township.

Notable persons

 Chen Di, Ming philologist, strategist, and traveler
 Huang Rulun
 Zheng Sixiao (Cheng Suu-hsiao)

Notes

References

External links

 Tourism website 
 Food culture – mudskippers 

County-level divisions of Fujian
Divided regions
Fuzhou